San Fernando is a town and one of the 119 Municipalities of Chiapas, in southern Mexico.

As of 2010, the municipality had a total population of 33,060, up from 26,436 as of 2005. It covers an area of 258.3 km2.

As of 2010, the town of San Fernando had a population of 9,651. Other than the town of San Fernando, the municipality had 196 localities, the largest of which (with 2010 populations in parentheses) were: El Progreso (2,704), El Copalar (2,039), Francisco I. Madero (1,993), Gabriel Esquinca (1,968), Benito Juárez (1,488), Viva Cárdenas (1,431), Álvaro Obregón (1,126), and 16 de Septiembre (1,020), classified as rural.

References

Municipalities of Chiapas